Curio crassulifolius, also known as blue fingers, is a succulent in the family Asteraceae that is native to South Africa.

Description
Curio crassulifolius is related to both Curio talinoides and Curio repens, but is closer to C. repens. Leaves are round and short in shape, blue in colour but would have reddish and purplish tones. Flowers are creamy white and sometimes yellow.

References

External links
Image showing the difference between 'crassifolius' and 'repens'

crassulifolius
Flora of Southern Africa
Garden plants of Southern Africa